Ecteinascidia turbinata, commonly known as the mangrove tunicate, is a species of  sea squirt species in the family Perophoridae. It was described to science in 1880 by William Abbott Herdman. The cancer drug trabectedin is isolated from E. turbinata.

Description
Ecteinascidia turbinata is a colonial sea squirt. They are connected by a stolon at the base through which blood circulates between the zooids and which serves to attach the colony to the substrate. The walls of the zooids are known as tunics and are strengthened with cellulose, which is unusual for an animal. They are connected to the outside water by siphons. The walls of the tunic are translucent and the pharyngeal basket can be seen through them. The siphon margins are orange because of the deposition of carotenoids there. This is a warning colour, for E. turbinata is distasteful, and deters predators.

Distribution and habitat
Ecteinascidia turbinata is found all the year round in shallow waters in the Caribbean Sea, the east coast of Florida, Bermuda and the Gulf of Mexico. In the summer it is occasionally found in Chesapeake Bay, off the coasts of North and South Carolina and in the Mediterranean Sea. It primarily grows on the submerged roots of mangroves (Rhizophora mangle). In Cuba, where it is abundant, it has been found at densities of one colony per metre of mangrove root. It is also found growing on rocks, jetties, the black coral (Antipathes caribbeana), floating debris and among seagrasses.

Biology
Ecteinascidia turbinata is a filter feeder. Each zooid draws water into its interior through the inhalant siphon at the top and expels it through the exhalant siphon. Food particles, mostly plankton, get trapped in mucus as the water passes through a mesh-like pharyngeal basket. From here the particles are moved by cilia to the U-shaped gut. Undigested remains get expelled through the anus near the exhalent siphon where they get carried away by the water current.

The colony can grow by budding, a form of asexual reproduction, new zooids growing from the stolon. In spring and early summer, sexual reproduction takes place. Ecteinascidia turbinata is a simultaneous hermaphrodite with eggs and sperm being produced by each individual. After fertilisation, the eggs are brooded in the body cavity for about a week. They then develop into bright yellow, tadpole-like larvae with a distinct notochord which pass out into the water column. They can swim and have a yolk on which they feed for several days. When this is exhausted they need to find a suitable place to settle and metamorphosize into a juvenile sea squirt, ready to start a new colony.

Ecology
Vanadium is accumulated in the tunic of Ecteinascidia turbinata where it may have a concentration one million times higher than that of the surrounding sea water. Its function is uncertain but, along with certain secondary metabolites, it renders the tunicate distasteful to predators, and the associated bright orange colouring advertises this. The flatworm Maritigrella crozierae is the main predator and seems immune to the anti-predator agents. It crawls over the surface of the colony and everts its pharynx into individual zooids, sucking out the tissues.

Other fouling organisms living in the vicinity of Ecteinascidia turbinata include sponges and other tunicates. Several species of amphipod live symbiotically inside the zooids.

One of the secondary metabolites produced by Ecteinascidia turbinata is an alkaloid, Ecteinascidin 743, also known as trabectedin, which has been found to have anti-tumour properties. It is undergoing clinical trials and is already in use in Europe under the trade name "Yondelis" for treatment of certain soft tissue sarcomas and recurrent ovarian cancer.

References

Enterogona
Animals described in 1880
Taxa named by William Abbott Herdman